Conservation Authority may refer to:

Conservation authority (Ontario, Canada), a local natural resource management agency
New Zealand Conservation Authority, an advisory body to the New Zealand Department of Conservation
Energy Efficiency and Conservation Authority, a New Zealand government/Crown agency responsible for promoting energy efficiency and conservation

See also
 Conservation Authorities Act, Ontario Provincial act to ensure the conservation, restoration and responsible management of hydrological features
 Conservation (disambiguation)